Calcio Fiorentino (also known as calcio storico "historic football") is an early form of football that originated during the Middle Ages in Italy. Once widely played, the sport is thought to have started in the Piazza Santa Croce in  Florence.  There it became known as the giuoco del calcio fiorentino ("Florentine kick game") or simply calcio, which is now also the name for association football in the Italian language. The game may have started as a revival of the Roman sport of harpastum.

History

Renaissance Era 

Calcio was reserved for rich aristocrats who played every night between Epiphany and Lent.  Even popes, such as Clement VII, Leo XI and Urban VIII, played the sport in Vatican City. The games could get violent as teams vied to score goals. A variation of Calcio Fiorentino was most likely played in the 15th century as well, as a match was organized on the Arno river in 1490, notable as a day so cold the waters were completely frozen.

On another famous occasion, the city of Florence held a match on February 17, 1530, in defiance of the imperial troops sent by Charles V, as the city was under siege. The "noble game" was played in Piazza Santa Croce, only by distinguished soldiers, lords, noblemen and princes.

A version of rules for the game were first recorded by Giovanni de' Bardi in the late 16th century.

Modern revival 

Interest in Calcio waned in the early 17th century. However, in 1930 it was reorganized as a game in Kingdom of Italy, under Benito Mussolini. It was widely played by amateurs in streets and squares using handmade balls of cloth or animal skin. Today, three matches are played each year in Piazza Santa Croce in Florence in the third week of June. A team from each quartiere of the city is represented:

 Santa Croce / Azzurri (Blues)
 Santa Maria Novella / Rossi (Reds)
 Santo Spirito / Bianchi (Whites)
 San Giovanni / Verdi (Greens)
After playing each other in two opening games, the two overall winners go into the yearly final on June 24, the feast of San Giovanni (St. John), the Patron Saint of Florence. For decades, this violent match has resulted in severe injuries, including death. During the early decades, in order to encourage wagering and achieve a bettable winner, there were times when bulls would be ushered into the ring in hopes of adding confusion and inciting victory. The modern version of calcio has not changed much from its historical roots, which allow tactics such as head-butting, punching, elbowing, and choking. However, due to often fatal injuries, sucker punches and kicks to the head are currently banned. It is also prohibited for more than one player to attack an opponent. Any violation leads to being expelled from the game.

The most successful team since 1979 is Santa Croce / Azzurri (Blues) with over 20 tournament wins. Tournaments have been cancelled on several occasions due to violence or foul play. These incidents have lead to major rule changes, such as ensuring players are born in Florence (or have been resident for at least ten years) and excluding players that have criminal convictions.

Rules

Matches last 50 minutes and are played on a field covered in sand, twice as long as it is wide (approximately ). A white line divides the field into two identical squares, and a goal net runs the width of each end.

Each team has 27 players and no substitutions are allowed for injured or expelled players. The teams are made up of four datori indietro (goalkeepers), three datori innanzi (fullbacks), five sconciatori (halfbacks), 15 innanzi or corridori (forwards). The captain and standard bearer's tent sits at the center of the goal net. They do not actively participate in the game, but can organize their teams and occasionally act as caccas (referees), mainly to calm down their players or to stop fights.

The referee and the six linesmen officiate the match in collaboration with the judge commissioner, who remains off the field. The referee, above everyone else, is the master of the field, and is responsible for making sure the game runs smoothly, stepping into the field only to maintain discipline and reestablish order when fights occur.

Shots from a small cannon or colubrine announces the beginning of the event. The game starts when the pallaio throws and kicks the ball toward the center line, then at the first whistle as the ball first rests on field, 15 forwards or corridori, begin fighting in a wild mixed martial arts match- punching, kicking, tripping, hacking, tackling, and wrestling with each other in an effort designed to tire opponents' defenses, but which often descends into an all-out brawl. They try to pin and force into submission as many players possible. Once there are enough incapacitated players, the other teammates come and swoop up the ball and head to the goal.

From this moment on, the players try by any means necessary to get the ball into the opponents' goal, also called caccia. The teams change sides with every caccia or goal scored. It is important to shoot with precision, because every time a player throws or kicks the ball above the net, the opposing team is awarded with a half caccia. The game ends after 50 minutes and the team which scored the most cacce wins.

Along with the palio, the winning team used to receive a Chianina, a type of pure-bred cow.  However, this has been reduced to a free dinner for the winning team; the players earn no other compensation.

In popular culture 
The comic book series Bitch Planet includes an event titled "Duemila" or "Megaton"; in issue #4 the event is described: "Megaton is one of many modern descendants of Calcio Fiorentino, a 16th century Italian sport... Teams may have any number of players, but their combined weight can be no more than !"

In the 2017 film Lost In Florence, Brett Dalton plays a former college football star who travels to Italy and becomes involved in playing Calcio Fiorentino.

In episode 4, "Judgement Day" of the TV series, Medici: Masters of Florence, the main characters engage in a game of Calcio Fiorentino in the main square of Florence during a flashback sequence.

In the sixth episode from the second season of Syfy Channel's HAPPY! (titled "Pervapalooza"), the demon Orcus references Calcio Storico while trapped inside Blue Scaramucci's body. The demon says that hockey seems like foxy boxing compared to calcio storico.
(Original airdate 5/1/2019)

Episode 1 of the 2020 Netflix series Home Game is dedicated to Calcio Storico, featuring behind-the-scenes player vignettes contemporary to the 2019 Reds-versus-Whites final match. In addition to providing historical information, the episode depicts interviews with players from both teams.

See also
 Football in Italy
 Rugby union in Italy
 Takanakuy, fighting festival in Peru
 Volata

References

External links

Calcio Storico: Everything You Need to Know
History of Soccer from ExpertFootball.com 
 Video: Calcio Storico Fiorentino Mini-Documentary
 Video: GEO Reportage "Florenz, Fussball bis aufs Blut" 
 Video: Florence Fight Club
 Photo gallery: parade and match on 24 June 2008 

Traditional football
Sports festivals in Italy
History of Florence
Sport in Florence
Sports originating in Italy
Historical competitions of Italy